The rivière des Perdrix flows in the municipalities of Notre-Dame-du-Rosaire, Cap-Saint-Ignace and Montmagny, in the Montmagny Regional County Municipality, in the administrative region of Chaudière-Appalaches, in Quebec, in Canada.

The Rivière des Perdrix is a tributary of the south bank of the Bras Saint-Nicolas, which flows on the southeast bank of the rivière du Sud (Montmagny); the latter flows north-east to the south shore of the St. Lawrence River.

Geography 

The main neighboring watersheds of the Perdrix river are:
 north side: St. Lawrence River, Bras Saint-Nicolas;
 east side: Guimont stream, Bras Saint-Nicolas, Inconnue River;
 south side: rivière du Sud (Montmagny), Fraser River, Alick River;
 west side: rivière du Sud (Montmagny), Bras Saint-Nicolas.

The Perdrix River has its source on the northern slope of the "Maple Mountain", on the northern slope of the Notre Dame Mountains, in the municipality of Notre-Dame-du-Rosaire. Several branches of mountain and forest streams feed the head of the Perdrix River.

  north-east in Notre-Dame-du-Rosaire, to the confluence of a stream branch (coming from the south);
  northward, up to the confluence of the Inconnue River (coming from the south-east);
  north, to the limit between Notre-Dame-du-Rosaire and Cap-Saint-Ignace;
  north, up to Chemin des Érables-Ouest;
  west, crossing the route des Pommiers, to Chemin Bellevue-Ouest;
  west, to the limit between Cap-Saint-Ignace and Montmagny;
  west, to highway 20;
  north, up to its confluence.

Rivière des Perdrix flows on the south shore of Bras Saint-Nicolas.

Toponymy 
The toponym Rivière des Perdrix was formalized on December 5, 1968, at the Commission de toponymie du Québec.

See also 

 List of rivers of Quebec

References 

Rivers of Chaudière-Appalaches
Montmagny Regional County Municipality